Mariana Franko (d. after 1777), was a free colored in Curaçao in the Dutch West Indies. She is known as the central figure in a famous court case.

She was born a free black in Sint Eustatius, owned a couple of slaves herself, and worked at the plantation Zorgvliet as an employed secretary. In 1758, her lover, the slave Pedro Anthonij, was sentenced for theft and sold, while she was exiled in 1760, left for the Netherlands and had her property confiscated. In 1764, she sued and questioned the verdict to clear her name and prove that all free citizens regardless of color were equal to the law. In 1772, the Dutch state finally brought the colonial authorities on Curaçao to court, and in 1777, she won the case and her property was restored (however, the costs of the trial consumed it).

References 

 Han Jordaan, Franko, Mariana, in: Digitaal Vrouwenlexicon van Nederland. URL: http://resources.huygens.knaw.nl/vrouwenlexicon/lemmata/data/Franko [13/01/2014]

18th-century people of the Dutch Empire
18th century in Curaçao
18th-century Dutch businesspeople
Dutch slave owners
Sint Eustatius people
Women slave owners
Free people of color